The Hainan flying squirrel (Hylopetes electilis) is a species of rodent in the family Sciuridae. It is endemic to Hainan Island in China.

It was formerly considered conspecific with the Indochinese flying squirrel (H. phayrei) until a 2013 study found them to be distinct species. Both species have anatomical and genetic differences, as well as differences in pelage coloration. They are thought to have a relatively recent genetic divergence from one another.

References 

Hylopetes
Rodents of China
Endemic fauna of Hainan
Mammals described in 1925
Taxa named by Glover Morrill Allen